PSGL is a rendering API available additionally to GCM and OpenGL for Sony's PlayStation 3. PSGL is based on OpenGL ES and Nvidia's CG. A previous version of PSGL was available for the PlayStation 2 but was largely unused.

PSGL was meant to be a foundation for the future, beyond the PlayStation 3, but for the PlayStation 4 Sony introduced GNM and GNMX and also their custom shading language, PlayStation Shader Language (PSSL).

Features
Programmable shading with Cg
OpenGL ES 1.1 extensions (VBO, FBO, PBO, Cubemap)
texture extensions (FP, DXT, 3D, NPO2, Aniso, Depth, Vertex Textures)
primitive/rendering extensions (Instancing, Primitive Restart, Queries, Conditional Rendering)
synchronization extensions (Fences, Events)
SCE performance extensions (TextureReference, AttribSet)

See also 
 Mantle API – low-level API for PC gaming
 GNM – low-level API on the PlayStation 4
 OpenGL – high-level API for CAD and gaming
 GNMX – high-level API on the PlayStation 4

References

3D graphics APIs
PlayStation 3